Ivan Aurrecoechea Alcolado (born 19 November 1995) is a Spanish basketball player who plays for Úrvalsdeild karla club Grindavík. He played college basketball for Indian Hills Community College and New Mexico State University.

Playing career

Early career
His first steps in basketball were at the local Torrejón Basketball Academy, in his hometown of Torrejón de Ardoz, in the outskirts of Madrid. During the 2013–2014 season, Aurrecoechea played for CB Estudiantes-b in the Liga EBA. The following season he played for CEBA Guadalajara in the LEB Plata.

College career
Aurrecoechea started his college career with Indian Hills Community College in 2016–17. He started 25 of 33 games as a freshman where he averaged 9.8 points and 9.4 rebounds. He earned ICCAC All-Region First-Team honors after guiding the Warriors to an NJCAA Region XI Championship. The following season he averaged 13.1 points and 11.5 rebounds per game, earning his second ICCAC All-Region First-Team honors. In 2018, he transferred to New Mexico State University. During the 2018–19 season he helped NM State to its third-straight WAC tournament title while averaging 9.6 points and 5.3 rebounds. During his senior season, he averaged 11.4 points and 5.6 rebounds per game and was named to the All-WAC First Team.

Professional career
In August 2020, Aurrecoechea signed with Úrvalsdeild karla club Þór Akureyri. He was an instant hit for the team, posting double-double in his first eight games of the season and fitting well with point guard Dedrick Basile. On 7 March 2021, he had 36 points and 15 rebounds in a victory against Grindavík. For the season he averaged 20.0 points and 11.3 rebounds per game during the regular season, helping Þór to a 7th place finish. During the playoffs, Aurrecoechea averaged 15.5 points and 10.0 rebounds in Þór's 1-3 loss against Þór Þorlákshöfn in the first round.

In August 2021, Aurrecoechea signed with Grindavík.

References

External links
Profile at Eurobasket.com
Icelandic statistics at Icelandic Basketball Association
Spanish statistics at Competiciones.feb.es
Profile at Proballers.com
NM State bio

1995 births
Living people
Basketball players from Madrid
Grindavík men's basketball players
New Mexico State Aggies men's basketball players
Spanish men's basketball players
Úrvalsdeild karla (basketball) players
Þór Akureyri men's basketball players